Niobium chloride may refer to:

 Niobium(IV) chloride (niobium tetrachloride), NbCl4
 Niobium(V) chloride (niobium pentachloride), NbCl5

Niobium compounds